Loukas Petridis was an Ottoman Greek priest, monk and Metropolitan bishop of the Ecumenical Patriarchate of Constantinople.

Biography 
Petridis was born in 1850 in Madytos, then Ottoman Empire (now Turkey). He became a monk in Karyes of Mount Athos and graduated from the Theological School of Halki in 1878. Then he served as a deacon of the Metropoly of Thessaloniki and later was appointed as a secretary of the ecclesiastical court. In 1886 he was elected Metropolitan of Serres. During his ecclesiastical career he also served as a Metropolitan bishop in Ainos since 1888, Dropull since 1899 and Veria in 1911.

Lastly, he served as a Metropolitan bishop in Philadelphia, where he died on 19 December 1912 at the age of 71 or 72.

References 

1850 births
1912 deaths
Greeks from the Ottoman Empire
Bishops in the Ottoman Empire
Bishops of the Ecumenical Patriarchate of Constantinople
Theological School of Halki alumni
People from Madytos
19th-century Eastern Orthodox archbishops
19th-century people from the Ottoman Empire
20th-century people from the Ottoman Empire
People associated with Mount Athos